Urophora jaceana is a species of tephritid or fruit flies in the genus Urophora of the family Tephritidae. The host plant for the larvae is usually black knapweed (Centaurea nigra) or Centaurea debeauxii.

Distribution
United Kingdom & Finland. South to France, Italy, Romania, Ukraine, east Russia; introduced to east Canada.

References

Urophora
Diptera of Europe
Gall-inducing insects
Insects described in 1935
Taxa named by Erich Martin Hering